Waldshut is a Landkreis (district) in the south of Baden-Württemberg, Germany. Neighbouring districts are (clockwise from the west) Lörrach, Breisgau-Hochschwarzwald and Schwarzwald-Baar; followed in the south by the Swiss cantons of Schaffhausen, Zürich and Aargau.

History
The district dates to the Oberamt Waldshut, which was created when the area became part of the state of Baden in the beginning of the 19th century. After some changes it was converted to a district in 1938. In 1973 the districts Säckingen and Hochschwarzwald were dissolved and were partially added to the district Waldshut, which then grew to its current size.

Geography
The district covers the southern part of the Black Forest. The river Rhine forms most of the boundary to Switzerland.

Coat of arms

The present coat of arms was granted on December 11, 1973, superseding an older one. The bend wavy represents the river Rhine as the main river of the district. The wheel on a blue ground symbolizes the district's hydro-electric power industry (there was also a wheel in the old coat of arms). The abbot's staff was taken from the arms of the district of Säckingen, to symbolize its monasteries. Green is used to signify the Black Forest.

Towns and municipalities

References

External links

 
 Information about the Waldshut region
 Waldshut district regional portal
 

 
Freiburg (region)
Districts of Baden-Württemberg
Baden